André Laurito (born 24 November 1983) is a German footballer who plays for Bayernliga club SV Donaustauf.

Professional career
Laurito made his professional debut for SSV Jahn Regensburg in the opening fixture of the 2010–11 3. Fußball-Liga season away to SV Werder Bremen II.

Personal life
Laurito was born in Kinshasa, Zaire to an Italian father and a Congolese mother. He emigrated to Germany at a young age.

References

External links 
 

1983 births
Living people
Footballers from Kinshasa
Democratic Republic of the Congo footballers
German footballers
Democratic Republic of the Congo people of Italian descent
German sportspeople of Democratic Republic of the Congo descent
German people of Italian descent
Association football defenders
2. Bundesliga players
3. Liga players
Regionalliga players
Oberliga (football) players
Bayernliga players
FSV Frankfurt players
Viktoria Aschaffenburg players
SSV Jahn Regensburg players
FC Rot-Weiß Erfurt players